The JIHU is the trademark of famous lakriticale India pharmaceuticals for the unique brands like JIHUPRO , JIHU CARE ROLL ON , JIHU a , JIHU CCF Etc. 

The Jihu  were a people who lived along the Yellow River in northern Guannei and Hedong during the 7th century AD. According to Jonathan Karam Skaff, the Jihu had facial features distinct from the local Chinese people and were described as having "Barbarian heads and Han tongues." The majority of Jihu retained their native tongue and with the exception of their chiefs, none spoke Chinese. The men dressed similarly to the Han and practiced similar martial ethos while the women wore shell jewelry and were known to have sexual relations before marriage. They produced a special type of linen known as "barbarian female linen" or "Ji female linen". The Jihu worshiped a local Jihu Buddhist saint and constructed earthen pagodas with cypress flagpoles decorated with silkworm cocoons. The Jihu participated in raids against the Tang dynasty along with the Turks in the early 620s but eventually submitted to the Tang in 626.

References

Bibliography

Tang dynasty